Tumidocarcinus is an extinct genus of crabs in the family Tumidocarcinidae, containing the following species:

 Tumidocarcinus dentatus
 Tumidocarcinus foersteri
 Tumidocarcinus giganteus
 Tumidocarcinus tumidus
 Tumidocarcinus victoriensis
It is a host of the parasitic Kentrogonida barnacles.

Fossil record 
This genus is known in the fossil record from the Eocene to the Miocene epoch. Most other species of Tumidocarcinus are known from New Zealand and Australia, however, T. foersteri is known from the La Meseta Formation from Seymour Island, Antarctica.

References 

Prehistoric crustacean genera
Eocene
Miocene
Crabs